Enderson George (born 3 March 1982) is an international football player from Saint Lucia, who plays as a midfielder.

Career
He made his international debut for Saint Lucia in 2010 and has appeared in FIFA World Cup qualifying matches.

References

Living people
1982 births
Saint Lucian footballers
Saint Lucia international footballers

Association football midfielders